Sport in New South Wales describes participation in and attendance at organised sports events in the state of New South Wales in Australia. Sport forms an integral part of the culture of the state. 

New South Wales has attracted many international multi-sport events including the 2000 Summer Olympics, held in Sydney. There are many professional sporting teams in New South Wales. The biggest sport in the state by a wide margin is rugby league, in which the state has 10 professional clubs in the National Rugby League. Other popular spectator sports include rugby union, cricket, Australian rules football and soccer. In terms of participation, the most popular sports in the state are netball, tennis, soccer and touch football.

Rugby league

Sydneysiders view rugby league football - usually called football, footy or simply league - as a sporting tradition within the city. This stems back from the earlier colonial days of the city where the city and its cultural were largely dictated by wealthy Englishmen whom traditionally played and were supporters of the Rugby code of football, which was largely advertised and passed on to the people of Sydney, including the working class who in back in England largely played soccer. In the early 1900s some Rugby footballers started to agitate to receive match payments. There was widespread disagreement as to whether or not this should happen. The working class strongly believed it was a good idea and that the players should at least share in some of the money which was filling the coffers of the governing body, whilst the middle class were more hesitant to do so. However the Rugby Football Union would not countenance payments of any sort, even 'broken time' payments for a player whilst an injury made him unable to work was deemed the 'thin edge of the wedge' for professionalism.  This resulted in a split similar to what had occurred in England, and the working class formed their own competition, the Rugby League, which followed the same rules as the equivalent breakaway competition in England. The game quickly grew a working-class following, and has been a Sydney tradition ever since. Rugby league is the most attended and viewed sport in the state by a wide margin.

The headquarters of the Australian Rugby League and National Rugby League (NRL) are in Sydney, which is home to 9 of the 16 National Rugby League (NRL) football clubs (Sydney Roosters, South Sydney Rabbitohs, Parramatta Eels, Cronulla Sharks, Wests Tigers, Penrith Panthers, Bulldogs and Manly-Warringah Sea Eagles), as well as being the northern home of the St George Illawarra Dragons, which is half-based in Wollongong. A tenth team, the Newcastle Knights are located in Newcastle.

The premier state-level league is the New South Wales Cup, involving reserve teams from NSW and Canberra based NRL clubs as well as the first teams from other clubs. Country football is overseen by the New South Wales Country Rugby League. Annual matches between City vs Country Origin teams are held.

The annual State of Origin series between the New South Wales Blues and the Queensland Maroons is a popular sporting event in NSW. Sydney has hosted many State of Origin matches since the series began in 1980. The three game series are held in Sydney and Brisbane with the first and third games in one city and the second in the other. These rotate every year, so if two games are played in Sydney one year, then those games are played in Brisbane the next.

Rugby union

Rugby union has a long history in New South Wales dating back to 1869.  However it lags in popularity behind rugby league. Rugby union is regarded as middle class game and is played in many of Sydney's top private schools.

Sydney has a local club rugby union competition (the Shute Shield), and a Super Rugby team the NSW Waratahs, who play their games in the city and represent the entire state of New South Wales. They were represented in the defunct Australian Rugby Championship by Sydney Fleet, Western Sydney Rams and Central Coast Rays. The National Rugby Championship has four NSW teams: Sydney Stars, Greater Sydney Rams, North Harbour Rays and NSW Country Eagles.

The  Australian Rugby Union headquarters are located in Sydney. The Waratahs play out of the Sydney Football Stadium, and when in Sydney the Wallabies play out of ANZ Stadium.

The New South Wales Waratahs won the Super Rugby title in 2014 in front of a record crowd at ANZ Stadium.

Cricket

Cricket is one of the most popular sports in New South Wales. The NSW Blues are by far the most successful domestic cricket side in Australia having won the First-class competition 44 times and the One-Day Domestic cup nine times. They occasionally play first-class matches against touring International sides. New South Wales have played teams representing every Test-playing nation bar Bangladesh. They have provided the Australian Test and One Day International teams with some of the finest players ever to have graced the game of cricket, the most notable of them being Sir Don Bradman, Steve Waugh, Brett Lee, Glenn McGrath and  many others. The current NSW Blues team's main home ground is the Sydney Cricket Ground. In the Twenty20 Big Bash League and Women's Big Bash League, the state is represented by the Sydney Sixers, playing at the Sydney Cricket Ground and the Sydney Thunder, playing at the Sydney Showground.

Association Football

Whilst having a strong sporting tradition in the field of Rugby League, Sydney also has a long and strong tradition in football. Early football clubs in Sydney were relatively small, and did not have very large followings, and like the general population of Sydney in the late 1800s the clubs were largely English in nature, but when the Australian government began its immigration policy in years closely following World War II, many immigrants left Europe in search of new homes in Sydney, and Australia in general. These migrant groups who were subject to racism from the existing population took it upon themselves to found their own football clubs, celebrating their particular ethnic communities. The three largest such clubs were founded by the three largest post war immigration groups respectively, they are: Marconi Stallions Football Club (Italian), Sydney Olympic Football Club (Greek), and Sydney United Football Club (Croatian). Along with these larger clubs, there are also many smaller clubs formed by ethnic groups, who also bare suburban names, such as Bankstown City Lions Football Club (Macedonian), Bonnyrigg White Eagles (Serbian), Parramatta Eagles (Maltese), and St. George Saints Football Club (Hungarian). These "ethnic" clubs soon began to dominate football in Sydney, drawing large crowd support from their given ethnic groups, and having their fair share of on field success too.

In the late 1980s there was a substantial rise in football hooliganism in Sydney  as was the case all around the world, but in Sydney however it was tainted further by racism which was caused by ethnic affiliations which the majority of the larger Sydney clubs had. This was also coupled with a steady decline in crowd numbers over the years, partly due to violence, partly due to the falling standard of play, but also largely because the clubs were not broadening their supporter bases. For example, Sydney United's support had not grown beyond Sydney's Croatian community, therefore the sport was not capitalising on the growing multiculturalism of the city, now becoming home to many new migrant communities from Arabic and Asian cultures, which to some may be seen as ironic because multiculturalism as well as the fact that the code played all over the world is often seen to be football's strongest asset. In an effort to fix these issues facing the game, Football Australia embarked upon "de-ethnicising" football, clubs with very strong links to ethnic groups were made to sever links with their traditional supporter bases and broaden their horizons, new clubs were founded and brought into the league such as Parramatta Power and Northern Spirit who did not have ethnic associations in a bid to attract a multicultural fan base. This attempt failed miserably, new clubs failed to attract a following and old clubs were not at all "de-ethnicised".

In 2005 a review of the game was carried out and it was decided that for the game to move forward in Sydney, and around Australia, some drastic changes would have to be made. A new club was founded in Sydney called Sydney FC, and they were to be based in central Sydney as opposed to being based at a small suburban stadium, and were founded specifically to attract a multicultural following. They were entered in a new league to be known as the A-League, this would act as the show piece national football competition, contested by similarly formed clubs from other large cities around Australia. There would be no form of relegation or promotion between the a-league and the rest of the counties competitions, and the previous national league would revert to its original form in state based competitions, which is where clubs such as the for mentioned ethnic clubs continue to play. In the first 6 years of their existence, Sydney FC have been relatively successful building up a solid support base of around 10,000 members, and sometimes attracting crowds of up to 40,000, which is admirable considering the youth of the club. The new system has not been without its flaws for Sydney football however, many of the great clubs, and the largest in the city are unable to win a national championship, nor are they able to qualify for the Asian Champions League, and a large section of the Greater Sydney Area is simply unable to access this new club due to the geographic size of the city. Change is however afoot, as a national cup competition is to be reintroduced in 2012 with the winner qualifying for the champions league, and the imminent foundation of a second new multicultural club in Sydney's sprawling western suburbs due to begin playing matches within 2 years.

Outside of Sydney, football has a similar history in the states larger regional cities (albeit on a smaller scale), and similar multicultural clubs have been formed such as: Newcastle Jets and Central Coast Mariners who both play in the A-league, and South Coast Wolves Football Club who play in the New South Wales premier league alongside many of Sydney's ethnic clubs, however there have been calls for them to be elevated into the A-league, and it expected that they eventually will be

Basketball

The Sydney Kings and Illawarra Hawks are the state's representatives in the National Basketball League (NBL), Australia's premier Men's basketball competition. The Kings won 3 consecutive premierships in 2002–03, 2003–04 & 2004–05 while the Hawks won in 2001. The Sydney Kings play their home games at Qudos Bank Arena in Sydney while the Illawarra Hawks play home games at WIN Entertainment Centre in Wollongong, the Illawarra's commercial centre.

The next level below the NBL Championship is NBL1, New South Wales will be represented as the East conference from 2022 onward. This conference will be made of select teams from the Waratah League, the current premier league for clubs in New South Wales. NBL1 and Waratah League have Men's and Women's competitions.

The Sydney Uni Flames are a professional women's side who play in the Women's National Basketball League.

Australian rules football

Australian rules football, commonly known in NSW as "AFL" (after the national professional Australian Football League competition), is a developing game in most of NSW with increasing popularity. Ausplay reported that there were 69,168 regular participants in New South Wales in 2019 a figure that exceeds participation in rugby union making it the 3rd most participated football code in the state. The sport is governed by AFL NSW/ACT.

Two fully professional teams are based in New South Wales, both from Sydney: the Sydney Swans and the Greater Western Sydney Giants. Formerly the South Melbourne Swans, the financially struggling club was relocated in 1982 and was renamed Sydney to capture a wider audience. After a long period with little success Sydney made the first of its six Grand Final appearances in 1996 and the first of two premierships in 2005. Since its first Grand Final appearance, Sydney has consistently averaged over 24,000 spectators to each home match, reaching a peak average home attendance of 36,612 in 1997. In 2003, Sydney drew a New South Wales record crowd of 72,393 which remains the record attendance in the history of the game for a match played outside of Victoria. The Giants, based in Western Sydney, were introduced in 2012. The two teams compete against each other in the Sydney Derby which drew a record crowd of 60,222 in 2016. The Giants have competed in the AFL Women's competition since its commencement in 2017 and the Swans have been granted a license to join in 2023.

Historically the game dates back to the 1880s in Sydney with the establishment of local competitions established in 1880, however it has struggled for marketshare against other football codes. Its popularity is highest in the less populous Riverina region closer to the Victorian border.

Snow sports

New South Wales is home to Australia's highest snow country, oldest skifields and largest resorts. Recreational Skiing in Australia began around 1861 at Kiandra, New South Wales, when Norwegian gold miners introduced the idea to the frozen hills around the town. The first and longest surviving ski club in the world, The Kiandra Snow Shoe Club is believed to have been formed at Kiandra in that year.

The Kiandra snow shoe club (now called the Kiandra Pioneer Ski Club (1861)) remains the world's first identifiable and ceaseless Ski Club. This Australian club has been continuously operating since 1861. Its origins have been recognised internationally and substantiated by the Holmenkollen Ski Museum, Norway in 2006. The discovery of gold in the mountains of America and Australia was the catalyst  for the development of recreational alpine skiing. The Kiandra Goldrush was short-lived, but the township remained a service centre for recreational and survival skiing for over a century. Australia's first T-Bar, was installed at Kiandra in 1957, but the ski facilities were finally shifted up the hill to Selwyn Snowfields in 1978. Steeper slopes and more reliable snows lie further to the south and in the 20th Century, the focus of recreational skiing in New South Wales shifted southward, to the Mount Kosciuszko region.

The first Kosciuszko Chalet was built at Charlotte Pass in 1930, giving relatively comfortable access to Australia's highest terrain. At 1760m, Charlotte Pass has the highest village base elevation of any Australian ski resort and can only be accessed via over-snow transport in winter. The growing number of ski enthusiasts heading to Charlotte Pass led to the establishment of a cafe at Smiggin Holes around 1939, where horse-drawn sleighs would deliver skiers to begin the arduous ski to the Kosciusko Chalet. It was the construction of the vast Snowy Mountains Hydro-Electric Scheme from 1949 that really opened up the Snowy Mountains for large-scale development of a ski industry and led to the establishment of Thredbo and Perisher as leading Australian resorts.  The Construction of Guthega Dam brought skiers to the isolated Guthega district and a rope tow was installed there in 1957.

Skifields up by Kosciusko's side were also established during this period, though their existence is now little realised. A rope tow was installed on Mount Northcote at the site and opened in 1954. The site proved excellent for speed skiing, but the hut was destroyed in an avalanche, which also killed one person, in 1956. Construction began at Thredbo in 1957. Today, Thredbo has 14 ski-lifts and possesses Australia's longest ski resort run, the 5.9 km from Karel's T-Bar to Friday Flat; Australia's greatest vertical drop of 672m; and  the highest lifted point in Australia at 2037m

The last establishment of a major skifield in NSW came with the development of Mount Blue Cow in the 1980s. In 1987 the Swiss designed Skitube Alpine Railway opened to deliver skiers from Bullocks Flat, on the Alpine Way, to Perisher Valley and to Blue Cow, which also opened in 1987. The operators of Blue Cow purchased Guthega in 1991, and the new combined resort later merged with Perisher-Smiggins to become the largest ski resort in the Southern Hemisphere. In 2009 Perisher had 48 lifts covering 1,245 hectares and four village base areas: Perisher Valley, Blue Cow, Smiggin Holes and Guthega.

The Kosciuszko Main Range in the Snowy Mountains of New South Wales offer some of the most challenging cross-country and back-country skiing in Australia, notably Watsons Crags and Mount Twynam on the steep Western Face of the Range. The Mount Jagungal wilderness area provides some of the most isolated back-country ski terrain. High country huts, often a legacy of the era of cattle grazing in the mountains, provide emergency shelter in these regions.

Netball

Suncorp Super Netball features two New South Wales based teams. The New South Wales Swifts are an established club, having previously played in the ANZ Championship and the Commonwealth Bank Trophy. Giants Netball were formed when the Greater Western Sydney Giants football club were given one of the three licenses for new teams for the first season of the Super Netball league in 2017.

Other teams
There are also many teams participating in other national sporting competitions based in New South Wales, mainly in Sydney and the surrounding areas. These include the Sydney Blue Sox in Australian Baseball League. The state's major motorsport teams are Walden Motorsport in Western Sydney and Albury-based Brad Jones Racing.

Other events
The popular equine sports of campdrafting and polocrosse were developed in New South Wales and competitions are now held across Australia. Polocrosse is now played in many overseas countries. Rodeos are popular events for competitors and spectators alike. The most important equine events in the state and the country are held at the Australian Equine and Livestock Events Centre in Tamworth in the states New England region.

Sydney was the host of the 2000 Summer Olympics and the 1938 British Empire Games. The Olympic Stadium, now known as ANZ Stadium, is the scene of the annual NRL Grand Final. It also regularly hosts rugby league State of Origin as well as rugby union and soccer internationals. It hosted the final of the 2003 Rugby World Cup and the memorable soccer World Cup qualifier between Australia and Uruguay.

The Sydney Cricket Ground traditionally hosts the 'New Year' cricket test match from 2–6 January each year. The annual Sydney to Hobart Yacht Race begins in Sydney Harbour on Boxing Day, whilst the climax of Australia's touring car racing series is the Bathurst 1000, held at the Mount Panorama Circuit near the city of Bathurst in the Western Plains.

The Sydney Autumn Racing Carnival features the richest two-year-old horse race in the world, the Golden Slipper Stakes, which is run in April every year. The Medibank International tennis tournament is held in January prior to the Australian Open. The City to Surf foot race is held every August and is one of the largest timed foot races in the world.

New South Wales Sports Awards
Each year the New South Wales Sport Awards are held. The major award is the Sport Star of the Year:
1994 Michelle Martin - Squash
1995 Michelle Martin - Squash
1996 Alyson Annan - Hockey
1997 Chris McCormack - Triathlon
1998 Ian Thorpe - Swimming
1999 Ian Thorpe - Swimming
2000 Layne Beachley - Surfing
2001 Ian Thorpe - Swimming
2002 Layne Beachley - Surfing
2003 Layne Beachley - Surfing
2004 Petria Thomas - Swimming
2005 Kate Bates - Cycling
2006 Brad Kahlefeldt - Triathlon
2007 Casey Stoner - Motorcycling
2008 Matthew Mitcham - Diving
2009 Dani Samuels - Track & Field
2010 Stephanie Gilmore - Surfing & Tom Slingsby - Sailing
2011 Tom Slingsby - Sailing
2012 Michael Clarke - Cricket
2013 Jessica Fox - Canoe Slalom

Current professional franchises in national competitions

Sydney

Outside Sydney

Venues

Sydney

Outside Sydney

Sydney Olympic Park

Sydney Olympic Park is roughly in the geographical centre of Sydney. Created for the 2000 Olympics, it is now a major sporting centre in the city.

Sydney Superdome
Sydney Superdome hosts miscellaneous events as Sydney's premier indoors facility. It has a maximum capacity of 21,000.

Stadium Australia

Stadium Australia, sponsored as ANZ Stadium, is Sydney's largest stadium. Built for the 2000 Olympics, it now hosts big events such as the NRL Grand Final, the rugby league State of Origin and rugby union and soccer internationals.

The venue is the home ground of NRL teams, the Canterbury-Bankstown Bulldogs and the South Sydney Rabbitohs and serves as an occasional home ground for the Parramatta Eels. ANZ Stadium also hosts a number of Swans home games and the occasional domestic cricket one-day match.

Other facilities
There are various other sporting and recreational facilities in the centre including another indoor arena, tennis centre, aquatic centre, athletics centre, hockey centre, archery centre, as well as the Sydney Showground. In 2009 the area hosted a motor race in the form of the Sydney 500 motor race to be held on a street circuit within the former Olympic grounds.

Moore Park

Sydney Football Stadium
Sydney Football Stadium was designed for the use of rugby league and is now also used for rugby union and soccer. The Sydney Roosters, the NSW Waratahs and Sydney FC soccer team use it as their home ground. The Wests Tigers use the stadium part-time as a home ground. The ground hosted the 2005–06 A-League grand final won by Sydney FC. The ground also hosted rugby league grand finals from its construction until ANZ Stadium was opened.

Sydney Cricket Ground

The Sydney Cricket Ground is mainly used for cricket games and Aussie rules matches. It is home to the Sydney Swans and NSW Blues. The ground held over 1000 rugby league first-grade matches in its history but is rarely used anymore.

References